This is a List of Long Beach historic landmarks.  These sites have been designated as historic landmarks in the Long Beach Municipal Code.  The city of Long Beach has recognized certain buildings and neighborhoods as having special architectural and historical value. The City Council designates historic landmarks and districts by city ordinance. In total, there are 114 Long Beach historic landmarks.

Listing of the Long Beach historic landmarks

Other Long Beach sites also recognized
The Long Beach Historic Landmarks listed above include many of the most important historic sites in the City of Long Beach.  Some others within the City of Long Beach have been listed on the National Register of Historic Places or designated as California Historical Landmarks.  These are:

See also
 National Register of Historic Places listings in Los Angeles County
 Los Angeles Historic-Cultural Monuments in the Harbor area
 List of locally designated landmarks by U.S. state

References

External links
 City of Long Beach Historic Landmarks
 Historical Society of Long Beach
 History of Long Beach
“Long Beach Lost” series by Brian Addison on Long Beach Post

 

Heritage registers in California
Lists of places in California
Landmarks in California
Locally designated landmarks in the United States